Catherine ("Cathy") Helen O'Neil is an American mathematician, data scientist, and author.  She is the author of the New York Times best-seller Weapons of Math Destruction, and opinion columns in Bloomberg View.   O'Neil was active in the Occupy movement.

Education and career 
O'Neil attended UC Berkeley as an undergraduate, received a Ph.D. in mathematics from Harvard University in 1999, and afterward held positions in the mathematics departments of MIT and Barnard College,. She left academia in 2007, and worked for four years in the finance industry.  After becoming disenchanted with the world of finance, O'Neil became involved with the Occupy Wall Street movement, participating in its Alternative Banking Group.

O'Neil operates the blog mathbabe.org and is a contributor to Bloomberg View.

Her first book, Doing Data Science, was written with Rachel Schutt and published in 2013. In 2016, her second book, Weapons of Math Destruction was published, long-listed for the National Book Award for Nonfiction and became a New York Times best-seller. A third book, The Shame Machine: Who Profits in the New Age of Humiliation, was published March 2022.

She is the founder of O'Neil Risk Consulting & Algorithmic Auditing (ORCAA), an algorithmic auditing company.

Awards 
In 1993 O'Neil was awarded the Alice T. Schafer Prize from the Association for Women in Mathematics and in 2019 she won the MAA's Euler Book Prize for her book Weapons of Math Destruction.

Personal life 
O'Neil lives in New York City and has three sons.

Bibliography
 With Rachel Schutt, Doing Data Science: Straight Talk from the Frontline (O'Reilly 2013).
 On Being a Data Skeptic (O'Reilly Media 2013).  
 Weapons of Math Destruction (Crown 2016).
 The Shame Machine: Who Profits in the New Age of Humiliation (Crown 2022).

References

External links
 
 ORCAA - O'Neil Risk Consulting & Algorithmic Auditing
 

Harvard University alumni
American bloggers
University of California, Berkeley alumni
Columbia University faculty
Columbia University Graduate School of Journalism faculty
American women mathematicians
21st-century American women scientists
Living people
Science bloggers
21st-century American non-fiction writers
American women bloggers
Year of birth missing (living people)
Data scientists
21st-century American mathematicians
Women data scientists